Pollenia griseotomentosa is a species of cluster fly in the family Polleniidae.

Distribution
Andorra, Austria, Belarus, Belgium, Czech Republic, Denmark, Finland, France, Germany, Great Britain, Hungary, Italy, Latvia, Netherlands, Poland, Russia, Slovakia, Spain, Sweden, Switzerland, Turkey, Ukraine. Introduced Canada.

References

Polleniidae
Insects described in 1944
Diptera of Europe